These are the Lithuanian football standings from 1961–1970.

1960/61

 A Klase
  
 Group I
 
  1 MSK Panevezys             22 17  3  2  79- 26  53  37
  2 Elnias Siauliai           22 17  2  3  60- 15  45  36
  3 Linu audiniai Plunge      22 12  4  6  45- 25  20  28
  4 KPI Kaunas                22 12  3  7  50- 28  22  27
  5 MSK Taurage               22 10  5  7  37- 39  -2  25
  6 Zalgiris N.Vilnia         22 11  1 10  42- 39   3  23
  7 Spartakas/Troleibusas V.  22  9  3 10  34- 54 -20  21
  8 KKI Kaunas                22  8  3 11  38- 29   9  19
  9 Raud. Spalis Kaunas       22  7  3 12  32- 47 -15  17
 10 Kooperatininkas Alytus    22  5  4 13  27- 42 -15  14
 11 EAG Kedainiai             22  4  2 16  20- 68 -48  10
 12 RMG Radviliskis           22  2  3 17  23- 75 -52   7
  
  Group II
 
  1 Baltija Klaipeda          22 14  3  5  60- 28  32  31
  2 Inkaras Kaunas            22 14  3  5  42- 21  21  31
  3 Lima Kaunas               22 12  2  8  46- 37   9  26
  4 Raud. zvaigzde Vilnius    22 10  6  6  36- 33   3  26
  5 Kooperatininkas Vilkavis. 22 11  2  9  46- 36  10  24
  6 Meliorator./Laisve Kret.  22  9  4  9  37- 41  -4  22
  7 Mastis Telsiai            22  9  3 10  44- 38   6  21
  8 Statybininkas Siauliai    22 10  1 11  34- 52 -18  21
  9 Cementininkas N.Akmene    22  9  2 11  37- 39  -2  20
 10 Sesupe Kapsukas           22  8  3 11  43- 42   1  19
 11 Lok Vilnius               22  6  2 14  25- 40 -15  14
 12 Kooperatininkas Ukmerge   22  3  3 16  40- 47  -7   9
 
 Final
 
  1 Elnias Siauliai            3  1  2  0   6-  2   4   4
  2 Baltija Klaipeda           3  1  1  1   6-  6   0   3
  3 Inkaras Kaunas             3  1  1  1   6-  7  -1   3
  4 MSK Panevezys              3  1  0  2   7- 10  -3   2
 
   
  5 Linu audiniai Plunge - Lima Kaunas  2:2  3:2
  7 KPI Kaunas - Raud. zvaigzde Vilnius  1:0  2:1
  9 MSK Taurage - Kooperatininkas Vilkaviskis  3:3  4:0
 11 Zalgiris N.Vilnia - Laisve Kretinga  3:3  4:0
 13 Mastis Telsiai - Troleibusas Vilnius  4:2  1:1
 15 Statybininkas Siauliai - KKI Kaunas  +:-
 17 Cementininkas N.Akmene - Raud. Spalis Kaunas  4:2  6:3
 19 Kooperatininkas Alytus - Sesupe Kapsukas  3:0  1:0
 21 EAG Kedainiai - Lok Vilnius  5:3  1:1
 23 Kooperatininkas Ukmerge - RMG Radviliskis  3:2  3:4  +:-
  
 
   CUP
  
 Semifinal
   Cementininkas N.Akmene - Baltija Klaipeda  2:1
   EAG Kedainiai - Karin. Namai Vilnius  1:0
 
 Final
   Cementininkas N.Akmene - EAG Kedainiai  1:0

1961/62

 A Klase
  
 Group I
  
  1 Inkaras Kaunas            22 14  6  2  58- 15  43  34
  2 Elnias Siauliai           22 12  7  3  49- 27  22  31
  3 Cementininkas N.Akmene    22 12  7  3  36- 22  14  31
  4 Politechnika (KPI) Kaunas 22 11  4  7  49- 33  16  26
  5 Linu audiniai Plunge      22  9  7  6  43- 24  19  25
  6 Dainava Alytus            22  9  4  9  33- 39  -6  22
  7 Nevezis (EAG) Kedainiai   22  8  3 11  38- 47  -9  19
  8 Tauras (MSK) Taurage      22  7  5 10  42- 51  -9  19
  9 Mastis Telsiai            22  5  5 12  36- 43  -7  15
 10 Audra Klaipeda            22  4  7 11  25- 55 -30  15
 11 Ausra Vilnius             22  4  6 12  23- 46 -23  14
 12 Baldininkas Ukmerge       22  4  5 13  32- 62 -30  13
  
 Group II
  
  1 Atletas (KKI) Kaunas       22 16  4  2  60- 18  42  36
  2 Granitas (Baltija) Klaip.  22 15  4  3  57- 22  35  34
  3 Lima Kaunas                22 15  2  5  52- 27  25  32
  4 Metalas Vilkaviskis        22 10  5  7  35- 34   1  25
  5 Maistas (MSK) Panevezys    22 10  2 10  63- 37  26  22
  6 Kauno audiniai             22  9  3 10  38- 41  -3  21
  7 Elfa Vilnius               22  8  5  9  35- 53 -18  21
  8 Sesupe Kapsukas            22  9  1 12  42- 47  -5  19
  9 Raud. zvaigzde Vilnius     22  7  5 10  36- 48 -12  19
 10 Minija Kretinga            22  5  4 13  31- 48 -17  14
 11 Sakalas (MSK) Siauliai     22  3  5 14  22- 54 -32  11
 12 Elektra (ETG) Mazeikiai    22  5  0 17  36- 78 -42  10
 
 Final
  
  1 Atletas Kaunas             26 20  4  2  65- 19  46  44
  2 Granitas Klaipeda          26 18  4  4  68- 27  41  40
  3 Inkaras Kaunas             26 16  6  4  62- 23  39  38
  4 Cementininkas N.Akmene     26 14  8  4  41- 25  16  36
  5 Lima Kaunas                26 16  3  7  57- 34  23  35
  6 Elnias Siauliai            26 12  8  6  53- 36  17  32
  7 Politechnika Kaunas        26 12  4 10  55- 40  15  28
  8 Metalas Vilkaviskis        26 11  6  9  41- 42  -1  28
 
  
  9 Linu audiniai Plunge - Maistas Panevezys  1:0
 11 Kauno audiniai - Dainava Alytus  2:1 6:1
 13 Nevezis Kedainiai - Elfa Vilnius  +:-
 15 Tauras Taurage - Sesupe Kapsukas  +:-
 17 Mastis Telsiai - Raud. zvaigzde  +:-
 19 Minija Kretinga - Audra Klaipeda  2:0 +:-
 21 Sakalas Siauliai - Ausra Vilnius  +:-
 23 Baldininkas Ukmerge - Elektra Mazeikiai  +:-
   
 
  
   CUP  
  
 Semifinal
   Lima Kaunas - Baldininkas Jonava  3:1
   Sesupe Kapsukas - Mastis Telsiai  3:0
  
 Final
  Lima Kaunas - Sesupe Kapsukas  3:1

1962/63

 A Klase
  
 Group I
 
  1 Maistas/Statyba Panevezys 22 17  5  0  66- 21  45  39
  2 Statybininkas Siauliai    22 10  5  7  36- 30   6  25
  3 Zalgiris N.Vilnia         22  8  8  6  25- 24   1  24
  4 Lima Kaunas               22  7  9  6  32- 26   6  23
  5 Tauras Taurage            22  6 11  5  40- 39   1  23 
  6 Atletas Kaunas            22  7  8  7  25- 17   8  22 
  7 Kauno audiniai            22  9  3 10  42- 47  -5  21 
  8 Metalas Vilkaviskis       22  8  5  9  25- 35 -10  21 
  9 Cementininkas N.Akmene    22  7  6  9  23- 22   1  20 
 10 Baltija Klaipeda          22  6  7  9  35- 43  -8  19 
 11 Baldininkas Ukmerge       22  6  5 11  33- 55 -22  17 
 12 Nevezis Kedainiai         22  3  4 15  31- 54 -23  10 
  
 Group II
 
  1 Poli Kaunas               22 16  5  1  49- 12  37  37 
  2 Inkaras Kaunas            22 15  6  1  46- 16  30  36
  3 Minija Kretinga           22 11  4  7  47- 27  20  26
  4 Elfa Vilnius              22  9  5  8  38- 38   0  23
  5 Granitas Klaipeda         22  9  5  8  30- 34  -4  23 
  6 Linu audiniai Plunge      22  9  3 10  33- 34  -1  21 
  7 Elnias Siauliai           22  8  4 10  33- 33   0  20 
  8 Elektra Mazeikiai         22  8  1 13  31- 48 -17  17 
  9 Mastis Telsiai            22  6  5 11  22- 46 -24  17 
 10 Dainava Alytus            22  7  2 13  28- 37  -9  16 
 11 Suduva Kapsukas           22  6  3 13  20- 40 -20  15
 12 Ekranas Vilnius           22  5  3 14  28- 40 -12  13 
 
 Final
  
  1 Statyba Panevezys         26 21  5  0  79- 26  53  47
  2 Poli Kaunas               26 18  6  2  60- 17  43  42
  3 Inkaras Kaunas            26 18  6  2  52- 18  34  42
  4 Minija Kretinga           26 12  5  9  54- 34  20  29
  5 Lima Kaunas               26  8 11  7  37- 31   6  27
  6 Elfa Vilnius              26 10  7  9  48- 47   1  27
  7 Statybininkas Siauliai    26 10  6 10  41- 47  -6  26
  8 Zalgiris N.Vilnia         26  8  9  9  25- 31  -6  25
 
  
   
   CUP
 
 Semifinal
   Saliutas Vilnius - Lima Kaunas  1:0  
   Zalgiris N.Vinia - Statyba Panevezys  1:0
 
 Final 
   Saliutas Vilnius - Zalgiris N.Vilnia  1:0

1964

 A Klase
  
  1 Inkaras Kaunas            30 24  2  4  72- 18  54  50
  2 Statyba Panevezys         30 16  8  6  61- 32  29  40
  3 Minija Kretinga           30 15  8  7  59- 40  19  38
  4 Lima Kaunas               30 15  8  7  50- 38  12  38
  5 Elfa Vilnius              30 16  4 10  49- 38  11  36
  6 Elnias Siauliai           30 15  6  9  47- 41   6  36
  7 Atletas Kaunas            30 12  8 10  33- 39  -6  32 
  8 Statybininkas Siauliai    30 11  8 11  43- 36   7  30 
  9 Elektra Mazeikiai         30 13  4 13  42- 39   3  30 
 10 Linu audiniai Plunge      30 10  7 13  44- 57 -13  27 
 11 Poli Kaunas               30  9  8 13  39- 51 -12  26 
 12 Kauno audiniai            30 10  5 15  35- 44  -9  25 
 13 Tauras Taurage            30  8  6 16  39- 55 -16  22
 14 Metalas Vilkaviskis       30  6  7 17  25- 40 -15  19 
 15 Zalgiris N.Vilnia         30  6  7 17  20- 48 -28  19
 16 Granitas Klaipeda         30  4  4 22  19- 61 -42  12
 
 Promotion
   Nevezis Kedainiai, Baltija Klaipeda, Saliutas Vilnius, Alytis Alytus
  
  
   CUP
  
 Semifinal 
   Minija Kretinga - Elnias Siauliai  3:1  
   Baltija Klaipeda - Inkaras Kaunas  2:0  
 
 Final
   Minija Kretinga - Baltija Klaipeda  3:2

1965

 A Klase 
  
  1 Inkaras Kaunas            30 18 10  2  73- 26  47  46
  2 Saliutas Vilnius          30 17  9  4  68- 18  50  43
  3 Statyba Panevezys         30 17  4  9  63- 36  27  38
  4 Nevezis Kedainiai         30 15  6  9  55- 35  20  36
  5 Statybininkas Siauliai    30 12  9  9  43- 31  12  33
  6 Elnias Siauliai           30 11 11  8  43- 36   7  33
  7 Baltija Klaipeda          30 12  9  9  46- 43   3  33
  8 Lima Kaunas               30 12  9  9  33- 36  -3  33
  9 Elektra Mazeikiai         30 14  3 13  49- 53  -4  31
 10 Minija Kretinga           30 13  4 13  50- 45   5  30
 11 Poli Kaunas               30 10  5 15  55- 46   9  25
 12 Linu audiniai Plunge      30  7 10 13  43- 60 -17  24
 13 Elfa Vilnius              30 10  2 18  37- 72 -35  22
 14 Tauras Taurage            30  8  5 17  33- 58 -25  21
 15 Alytis Alytus             30  5  6 19  32- 74 -42  16
 16 Atletas Kaunas            30  5  6 19  25- 79 -54  16
  
 Promotion
   Vimpelas Kaunas, Cementininkas N.Akmene
  
 
   CUP
  
 Semifinal
   Inkaras Kaunas - Elektra Mazeikiai  1:0 
   Saliutas Vilnius - Vimpelas Kaunas  2:0 
  
 Final
   Inkaras Kaunas - Saliutas Vilnius  4:2

1966

 Auksciausia Lyga
 
  1 Nevezis Kedainiai         28 16  9  3  57- 22  35  41 
  2 Statybininkas Siauliai    28 16  8  4  39- 20  19  40
  3 Saliutas Vilnius          28 16  6  6  41- 17  24  38
  4 Inkaras Kaunas            28 15  3 10  49- 31  18  33
  5 Lima Kaunas               28 12  9  7  42- 34   8  33
  6 Statyba Panevezys         28 14  4 10  41- 32   9  32 
  7 Elnias Siauliai           28  9 11  8  30- 30   0  29
  8 Linu audiniai Plunge      28 11  7 10  32- 38  -6  29
  9 Vimpelas Kaunas           28  8 11  9  31- 25   6  27
 10 Poli Kaunas               28  9  9 10  28- 26   2  27
 11 Atletas Kaunas            28  7 11 10  36- 42  -6  25
 12 Cementininkas N.Akmene    28  7 10 11  26- 48 -22  24
 13 Minija Kretinga           28  7  6 15  30- 40 -10  20
 14 Baltija Klaipeda          28  5  9 14  31- 37  -6  19
 15 Elektra Mazeikiai         28  1  1 26   9- 80 -71   3
   
 Promotion
   Chemikas Klaipeda, Zalgiris N. Vilnia
 
  
   CUP   
  
 Semifinal
   Zalgiris N.Vilnia - Inkaras Kaunas  1:0 
   Saliutas Vilnius - Elnias Siauliai  2:0 
  
 Final
   Zalgiris N.Vilnia - Saliutas Vilnius  0:0  1:0

1967

 Auksciausia Lyga
 
  1 Saliutas Vilnius          28 17  9  2  43- 11  32  43
  2 Inkaras Kaunas            28 16  8  4  33- 14  19  40
  3 Nevezis Kedainiai         28 13 11  4  34- 12  22  37
  4 Statyba Panevezys         28 16  4  8  42- 19  23  36
  5 Minija Kretinga           28 11 11  6  36- 25  11  33
  6 Politechnika Kaunas       28 11  8  9  34- 26   8  30
  7 Statybininkas Siauliai    28  9 11  8  35- 26   9  29
  8 Zalgiris N. Vilnia        28  7 12  9  28- 27   1  26
  9 Atletas Kaunas            28  7 12  9  19- 23  -4  26
 10 Lima Kaunas               28 10  5 13  26- 38 -12  25
 11 Linu audiniai Plunge      28  9  4 15  18- 39 -21  22
 12 Chemikas Klaipeda         28  7  6 15  19- 39 -20  20
 13 Banga Kaunas              28  5  8 15  17- 39 -22  18
 14 Baltija Klaipeda          28  7  4 17  16- 47 -31  18
 15 Elnias Siauliai           28  6  5 17  22- 37 -15  17
 
 Promotion 
   Autoparkas Kaunas, Suduva Kapsukas
  
 Win in Group A Zalgiris: Autoparkas Kaunas
 Win In Group A Nemunas: Technika Radviliskis
 
   CUP
  
 Semifinal
   Nevezis Kedainiai - Minija Kedainiai  2:2 1:0
   Statyba Panevezys - Politechnika Kaunas  1:0
  
 Final
   Nevezis Kedainiai - Statyba Panevezys  2:1

1968

 Auksciausia Lyga 
 
  1 Statyba Panevezys         30 22  8  0  69- 19  50  52
  2 Nevezis Kedainiai         30 22  7  1  64- 15  49  51
  3 Statybininkas Siauliai    30 18  6  6  62- 19  43  42
  4 Inkaras Kaunas            30 16  6  8  54- 36  18  38
  5 Atletas Kaunas            30 11 11  8  26- 21   5  33
  6 Zalgiris N. Vilnia        30 13  6 11  33- 42  -9  32
  7 Politechnika Kaunas       30 12  6 12  45- 38   7  30
  8 Elnias Siauliai           30 11  8 11  30- 38  -8  30
  9 Saliutas/Pazanga Vilnius  30  9  9 12  30- 32  -2  27
 10 Banga Kaunas              30 11  5 14  29- 35  -6  27
 11 Granitas Klaipeda         30  8 10 12  22- 28  -6  26
 12 Suduva Kapsukas           30  9  8 13  37- 45  -8  26
 13 Lima Kaunas               30  7  8 15  34- 60 -26  22
 14 Minija Kretinga           30  6  8 16  33- 50 -17  20
 15 Linu audiniai Plunge      30  5  3 22  30- 59 -29  13
 16 Autoparkas Kaunas         30  3  5 22  21- 82 -61  11
  
 Promotion
   Ekranas Panavezys, Vienybe Ukmerge, Tauras Taurage
 
 Win in Group A Zalgiris: Ekranas Panevezys
 Win in Group A Nemunas: Vienybe Ukmerge
  
   CUP
  
 Semifinal 
   Nevezis Kedainiai - Saliutas Vilnius  2:1
   Pazanga Vinius - Baldininkas Ukmerge  +:-
  
 Final
   Nevezis Kedainiai - Pazanga Vilnius  6:0

1969

 Auksciausia Lyga
 
  1 Statybininkas Siauliai    32 20  9  3  56- 17  39  49
  2 Nevezis Kedainiai         32 20  7  5  63- 26  37  47
  3 Inkaras Kaunas            32 18  7  7  46- 20  26  43
  4 Atletas Kaunas            32 15 12  5  45- 19  26  42
  5 Statyba Panevezys         32 16  9  7  50- 31  19  41
  6 Lima Kaunas               32 14 11  7  48- 29  19  39
  7 Politechnika Kaunas       32 15  8  9  37- 26  11  38
  8 Vienybe Ukmerge           32 13  7 12  40- 33   7  33
  9 Granitas Klaipeda         32 10 10 12  26- 27  -1  30
 10 Minija Kretinga           32 10 10 12  32- 36  -4  30
 11 Ekranas Panevezys         32 11  5 16  40- 49  -9  27
 12 Pazanga Vilnius           32  7 12 13  34- 49 -15  26
 13 Banga Kaunas              32  8  9 15  27- 43 -16  25
 14 Suduva Kapsukas           32  9  5 18  26- 54 -28  23
 15 Tauras Taurage            32  6 10 16  22- 42 -20  22
 16 Elnias Siauliai           32  3  9 20  21- 57 -36  15
 17 Zalgiris N. Vilnia        32  4  6 22  23- 78 -55  14
 
 
 
 Win in Group A Zalgiris: Elfa Vilnius  
 Win In Group A Nemunas: Dainava Alytus 
  
   CUP
  
 Semifinal
   Inkaras Kaunas - Nevezis Kedainiai  2:1
   Vienybe Ukmerge - Granitas Klaipeda  2:1
  
 Final
   Inkaras Kaunas - Vienybe Ukmerge  2:0  1:1

1970

 Auksciausia Lyga
  
  1 Atletas Kaunas            32 22  6  4  60- 16  44  50
  2 Politechnika Kaunas       32 19  6  7  45- 28  17  44
  3 Nevezis Kedainiai         32 16  9  7  50- 26  24  41
  4 Inkaras Kaunas            32 16  9  7  36- 18  18  41
  5 Statybininkas Siauliai    32 13 13  6  42- 25  17  39
  6 Dainava Alytus            32 15  8  9  37- 30   7  38
  7 Vienybe Ukmerge           32 14  8 10  44- 35   9  36
  8 Granitas Klaipeda         32 11 11 10  42- 29  13  33
  9 Minija Kretinga           32 12  8 12  50- 35  15  32
 10 Statyba Panevezys         32 12  8 12  27- 29  -2  32
 11 Ekranas Panevezys         32 11  7 14  29- 37  -8  29
 12 Banga Kaunas              32  7 14 11  31- 30   1  28
 13 Lima Kaunas               32 11  6 15  38- 45  -7  28
 14 Pazanga Vilnius           32  9  8 15  19- 42 -23  26
 15 Tauras Taurage            32  8  6 18  40- 66 -26  22
 16 Elfa Vilnius              32  6  6 20  22- 58 -36  18
 17 Suduva Kapsukas           32  2  3 27  14- 77 -63   7
 
 
 Win in Group A Zalgiris: Inzinerija Vilnius
 Win in Group A Nemunas: Chemikas Kedainiai
  
   CUP
  
 Semifinal
   Nevezis Kedainiai - Dainava Alytus  2:1 
   Minija Kretinga - Politechnika Kaunas  3:1
  
 Final
   Nevezis Kedainiai - Minija Kretinga  0:0  3:1

Sources
RSSF/Almantas Lahzadis

Football in Lithuania